Army Public Schools & Colleges System (APSACS) is a school system operated by Pakistan Army. APSAC System operates in 18 regions across Pakistan, with supervision by 18 regional directors. They are sub-divided into 18 regions. APSACS Secretariat serves as central unifying body, which controls technical aspects of the system. In the 18 regions of APSACS, X Corps (Pakistan) Region is the largest in terms of schools & colleges. There are about 40 APS&Cs Under X Corps (Pakistan) Region. Brigadier General (R) Tahir Ali Syed Sitara-i-Imtiaz (Military) Is Serving as Regional Director of X Corps (Pakistan) Region.

History
Army Public School were founded by Pakistan Army to provide quality education to the children of Pakistan Army personnels. The schools are well-equipped with labs, at par with any American subsurban school. The students can opt for O Levels examination system, a British qualification, or local qualification.

List of regions 
 Joint Staff (JS) region: 1 school
 Rawalpindi I (QMG) region: 3 schools
 Rawalpindi II (E in C) region: 6 schools
 Rawalpindi III (X Corps)  region: 37 schools (largest region) | Regional Director is Brigadier (R) Tahir Ali Syed SI (Military) 
 Mangla  region: 5 schools
Multan   region: 7 schools 
Lahore   region:15 schools
 Karachi region: 19 schools 
 Peshawar region: 19 schools
 Quetta region:14 schools
 Gujranwala region: 15 schools
 Bahawalpur region: 10 schools
 Rawalpindi IV (AAD) region:13 schools
 Rawalpindi V (ISI) region: 6 schools 
 Rawalpindi VI (GHQ) region: 7 schools 
 Nowshera/Attock region: 7 schools 
 Abbotabad region: 3 schools 
 Cherat region: 6 schools

Faculty

Umera Ahmed - former teacher at Army Public College, Sialkot's Cambridge wing, known for her critically acclaimed works, including Pir-e-Kamil, Meri Zaat Zarra-e-Benishan, Shehr-e-Zaat, Zindagi Gulzar Hai.  Director & Regional Director of the system:
Tahira Qazi - Principal of APS&C for Boys Peshawar from 2006 to 2014, and associated with APSACS since 1994, she was killed along with 140+ others by the Taliban while rescuing her school children, in the Peshawar School Attack, 2014 on 16 December.
Saeed Rashid PP - writer, teacher and historian, was the Principal of Army Public School Jhelum and Mangla Cantt from 1990 to 1994.
Tahir Ali Syed - Brigadier General (R) Tahir Ali Syed Sitara-i-Imtiaz (Military) is Regional Director of X Corps (Rawalpindi Corps) also known as RD Of X Corps (Pakistan). X Corps (Pakistan) or Rawalpindi Corps Region is the Biggest Region of APSACS. The Region Controls 37x APSACS Schools & Colleges which are registered with APSACS Secretariat. It also controls other APSACS Which are not registered with APSACS Secretariat. Tahir Ali Syed is serving at this post for almost three years from 2020.

See also
2014 Peshawar school attack
Army Burn Hall College
Federal Board of Intermediate and Secondary Education

References

External links

Military schools in Pakistan
School systems in Pakistan